Lgandula Ramana popularly known as L. Ramana was born on 4 September 1961 in Jagtial . He is EX President of Telugu Desam Party (TDP) for Telangana state. He is the son of Ganga Ram. Lgandula Ramana is a Telangana Rashtra Samithi politician from Karimnagar.

Personal life
He is a graduate with a Bachelor of Science from SKNR Degree College (1978–81). He is a politician and social worker by profession.
He was married to Sandhya on 8 August 1990.
He has two sons, elder son Dr. L. Manikanta, is a MBBS graduate from Kamineni Institute of Medical Sciences and younger son L. Karthikeya, is a BBA graduate from Amity University Dubai.

Positions held
 Member of Legislative Assembly AP (2009-2014)
 A.P. Khadi Village Industries Board Chairman
 Member of Parliament, Lok Sabha (11th) - 1996-98
 Member of AP Legislative Assembly - 1994-96
 Minister of Handlooms and Textiles - 1994-96
 Former President of Telangana Telugu Desam Party
 Member of Telangana Legislative Council - Present

References

People from Karimnagar district
People from Telangana
Telugu politicians
India MPs 1996–1997
Lok Sabha members from Andhra Pradesh
1961 births
Living people